The sombre whip snake (Demansia quaesitor) is a species of venomous snake in the family Elapidae.

References

Demansia
Snakes of Australia
Reptiles described in 2007
Reptiles of Queensland
Reptiles of the Northern Territory
Reptiles of Western Australia